Peter Kelamis (born December 11, 1967) is an Australian-Canadian actor, stand-up comedian and impressionist. He is known for playing Tail Terrier in Krypto the Superdog, Dr. Adam Brody in Stargate Universe, Goku in Ocean's English dubs of the animated series Dragon Ball Z, and Rolf from Ed, Edd n Eddy.

Career
Some of his appearances on television were in Eureka, The Outer Limits, Corner Gas, Sliders, Stargate SG-1, Stargate Universe, The Sentinel, NCIS and The X-Files. Film appearances include; Happy Gilmore, Fear of Flying, I'll Be Home for Christmas, Best in Show, The Sport Pages: The Heidi Bowl, and Everything's Gone Green. Kelamis also had a recurring role in Beggars and Choosers.

As a voice actor, he replaced Ian James Corlett as the voice of Goku during 1997 in FUNimation/Saban's short-lived original dub of Dragon Ball Z, and also voiced Goku in FUNimation and Pioneer's 1997-1998 dub of the Dragon Ball Z movies Dead Zone, The World's Strongest, and The Tree of Might. During 2000, Kelamis reprised the role in an unrelated dub produced by Westwood Media and AB Groupe for the UK (and later Canada). He left in the middle of the Cell arc, with Kirby Morrow voicing Goku for the remainder of the production. Kelamis has since stated he would have continued voicing Goku for the rest of the series, but was under the impression that the dub was ending, when it was in fact merely on a temporary recording hiatus. He has also famously voiced Rolf in Ed, Edd n Eddy as well as Whiplash in Iron Man: Armored Adventures. Kelamis originally auditioned to play the Eds as well as the other male characters in Ed, Edd n Eddy but did not land either role. Instead, Kelamis was encouraged by voice director Terry Klassen to play the character of Rolf. He also voiced Reaper in the video game Devil Kings as well as provided the voice of Byrne in the CGI animation, Dreamkix.

Outside of acting, Kelamis also worked as a stand-up comedian, he performed his very first stand-up comedy act in the fourth grade. Kelamis made his first stand-up comedy appearance at the Punchlines Comedy Club in Gastown.

Personal life
Kelamis is of Greek descent, and is Greek Orthodox Christian, having attended Saint George's Cathedral in Vancouver. In 2004, he married his second wife, Vancouver-born Canadian actress Alannah Stewartt. They have a daughter.

Filmography

Film

Television

Video games

Awards and nominations
 2004 - Video Premiere Award for Best Animated Character Performance - Nominated
 2007 - Leo award for Best Screenwriting in a Music, Comedy, or Variety Program or Series - Won

References

External links
 
 
 

Living people
Australian emigrants to Canada
Australian male comedians
Australian male film actors
Australian male television actors
Australian male video game actors
Australian male voice actors
Australian people of Greek descent
Canadian expatriate male actors in the United States
Canadian male film actors
Canadian male television actors
Canadian male video game actors
Canadian male voice actors
Canadian people of Greek descent
Comedians from Sydney
Comedians from Vancouver
Male actors from Sydney
Male actors from Vancouver
20th-century Australian male actors
20th-century Canadian male actors
21st-century Australian male actors
21st-century Canadian male actors
1967 births